Muhammed Akarslan (born 2 April 1995) is a Turkish footballer who plays for Pendikspor.

Career
He made his Süper Lig debut on 16 May 2014.

References

External links
 
 
 
 
 
 

1995 births
People from Sincik
Living people
Turkish footballers
Association football midfielders
Fenerbahçe S.K. footballers
Sarıyer S.K. footballers
Fatih Karagümrük S.K. footballers
Diyarbakırspor footballers
Tuzlaspor players
Eyüpspor footballers
Pendikspor footballers
Süper Lig players
TFF First League players
TFF Second League players
TFF Third League players